This Group Of People (TGOP) is a Taiwanese comedy YouTube channel. It is the most subscribed YouTube channel from Taiwan, having over 3.48 million subscribers.

Popularity
The channel is the most subscribed YouTube channel in Taiwan. The channel was also the first channel from Taiwan to hit over 1 million subscribers and, in 2017, the first channel to hit over 2 million as well. For the last couple of years, their main channel videos have been subtitled in English.

History
The group member first collaborated in 2008 for a highschool drama group, but the group disbanded later. In 2011, the group got back together starting to film comedy sketches. By August 2016, their channel became the first in Taiwan to hit 1 million subscribers, which they celebrated by releasing the first 'Super Lousy Cover Songs' video. By 2020, TGOP hit 3.3 million subscribers.

Content

Series
 Classic Quotation
 My Baby is the Best: in collaboration with Shaogao
 Lousy Cover Songs: foreign top 40 songs translated into Mandarin and Taiwanese, and their music videos imitated in a visibly improvised manner by the group members.
 Boring News
 The Coworkers

Members

Guest Appearances
The channel's popularity and local celebrity status have allowed them to attract celebrity guest stars such as:
 Lee Chien-na in Classic Quotes for Breaking Up
 G.E.M. in When My Girl Friend Wants To Watch TV Series
 William Xie in Comparison of Classical and Contemporary Chinese

Discography
The group has also released several pop music singles.

Related channels
 T.G.O.P. vlog, behind the scenes and travel videos of group members
 Keelong and Rays, vlog and interview channel of Keelong and Rays
 T.G.O.P. ads, advertising work
 Alina Cheng, music videos

References 

Taiwanese actors
YouTube channels launched in 2011
Taiwanese YouTubers